"Love Song" is M-Flo's twenty-second single under Rhythm Zone. It contains two songs from their then-upcoming 2007 album, Cosmicolor, a remix of "Lotta Love", and instrumentals. It was released on November 8, 2006. First pressings of the single will include CD-Extra footage of a live "Summer Time Love" performance.

"Love Song" is Bonnie Pink's twenty-sixth single.

Track listing
 M-Flo Loves Bonnie Pink – "Love Song" (M-Flo, Bonnie Pink) – 5:44
 M-Flo Loves Doping Panda – "She Loves the Cream" (M-Flo, Yutaka Furukawa) –　6:45
 M-Flo Loves Minmi – "Lotta Love: Yasutaka Nakata Capsule Mix" (M-Flo, Minmi) – 7:09
 M-Flo Loves Bonnie Pink – "Love Song: Instrumental" (M-Flo, Bonnie Pink) – 5:44
 M-Flo Loves Doping Panda – "She Loves the Cream: Instrumental" (M-Flo, Yutaka Furukawa) – 6:45

Charts

2006 singles
2006 songs
M-Flo songs
Songs written by Verbal (rapper)
Songs written by Taku Takahashi